KVLE-FM (102.3 FM, "Valley 102.3") is a radio station broadcasting an adult contemporary music format. Licensed to Gunnison, Colorado, United States, the station is currently owned by John Harvey Rees through licensee Bobcat Radio, Inc., and features programming from Citadel Broadcasting.

References

External links

VLE-FM
Mainstream adult contemporary radio stations in the United States